Garcinia eugeniaefolia is a species of flowering plant in the family Clusiaceae. It is found in Indonesia (Kalimantan and Sumatra Islands), Philippines, Malaysia and India.

This species name may be synonymous with Garcinia rostrata.

References

eugeniaefolia
Taxonomy articles created by Polbot